The chum salmon (Oncorhynchus keta), also known as dog salmon or keta salmon, is a species of anadromous salmonid fish from the genus Oncorhynchus (Pacific salmon) native to the coastal rivers of the North Pacific and the Beringian Arctic, and is often marketed under the trade name silverbrite salmon in North America. The English name "chum salmon" comes from the Chinook Jargon term tzum, meaning "spotted" or "marked"; while keta in the scientific name comes from Russian, which in turn comes from the Evenki language of Eastern Siberia.

In Greater China, it is known academically as the "hook-snout salmon", but is more often called the damaha fish, which is borrowed from dawa ịmaχa, the Nanai name of the fish used by the Hezhe minority in northern Northeast China.

Description

The body of the chum salmon is deeper than most salmonid species. In common with other species found in the Pacific, the anal fin has 12 to 20 rays, compared with a maximum of 12 in European species. Chum have an ocean coloration of silvery blue green with some indistinct spotting in a darker shade, and a rather paler belly. When they move into fresh water the color changes to dark olive green and the belly color deepens. When adults are near spawning, they have purple blotchy streaks near the caudal peduncle, darker towards the tail. Spawning males typically grow an elongated snout or kype, their lower fins become tipped with white and they have enlarged teeth.  Some researchers speculate these characteristics are used to compete for mates.

Sizes

Life cycle
Chum live for an average of 3 to 5 years, and chum in Alaska mature at the age of 5 years.

Spawning

Most chum salmon spawn in small streams and intertidal zones. Some chum travel more than  up the Yukon River. Chum  fry migrate out to sea from March through July, almost immediately after becoming free swimmers. They spend one to three years traveling very long distances in the ocean. These are the last salmon to spawn (November to January) in some regions. In Alaska they are the first to spawn in June and August and are then followed by pink and coho salmon. They die about two weeks after they return to the freshwater to spawn. They utilize the lower tributaries of the watershed, tend to build nests called redds, really little more than protected depressions in the gravel, in shallow edges of the watercourse and at the tail end of deep pools. The female lays eggs in the redd, the male sprays milt on the eggs, and the female covers the eggs with gravel. The female can lay up to 4000 eggs.

Diet
Juvenile chum eat zooplankton and insects. Recent studies show that they also eat comb jellies. As adults, they eat smaller fish.

Distribution

Chum salmon have the largest natural range of any Pacific salmon. Chum are found all around the North Pacific, off the coasts of Japan, Korea, the Russian Far East, British Columbia in Canada, and from Alaska to California in the United States. They undergo the longest migrations within the genus Oncorhynchus, far up the Yukon River in Alaska and Canada, and deep into the Amur River basin in Northeast China and Russia. In lesser numbers they migrate thousands of kilometers up the Mackenzie River. In the Arctic Ocean they are found in limited numbers from the Laptev Sea to the Beaufort Sea. In North America chum salmon spawn from the Mackenzie River in the Arctic to as far south as the Umpqua River, Oregon, although they were also reported in the San Lorenzo River near Santa Cruz, California in 1915 and the Sacramento River in northern California in the 1950s.

In the open ocean, chum salmon stay fairly high on the water column, rarely diving below .

Commercial use and value

The registered total harvest of the chum salmon in the North Pacific in 2010 was some 313,000 tons, corresponding to 91 million fish. Half of the catch was from Japan, and about a quarter each from Russia and the United States. The chum salmon harvest was about 34% of the total harvest of all Pacific salmon species by weight.

The chum salmon is the least commercially valuable salmon in North America. Despite being extremely plentiful in Alaska, commercial fishers often choose not to target them because of the low market value. Recent market developments have increased the demand for chum salmon, due to new markets developed from 1984 to 1994 in Japan and Northern Europe. They are a traditional source of dried salmon.

Conservation

Two populations of chum salmon have been listed under the Endangered Species Act as threatened species. These are the Hood Canal Summer Run population and the Lower Columbia River population.

Susceptibility to diseases
Chum are thought to be fairly resistant to whirling disease, but it is unclear.

Notes

References
 National Marine Fisheries Service chum salmon web page
Chum Salmon - Britannica 
 
 Alaska Department of Fish and Game
 National Marine Fisheries Service ESA Listings

chum salmon
Freshwater fish of the Arctic
Cold water fish
Fish of the North Pacific
Western North American coastal fauna
chum salmon
Salmon
Taxa named by Johann Julius Walbaum